Plunder is a 1931 British comedy film directed by and starring Tom Walls. It also features Ralph Lynn, Winifred Shotter and Robertson Hare. It was based on the original stage farce of the same title, and was the second in a series of film adaptations of Aldwych farces by Ben Travers, adapted in this case by W. P. Lipscomb, and was a major critical and commercial success helping to cement Walls's position as one of the leading stars of British cinema.

It was made at British and Dominion's Elstree Studios. The film's sets were designed by the art director Lawrence P. Williams.

Cast
 Ralph Lynn as Darcy Tuck
 Tom Walls as Freddie Malone
 Winifred Shotter as Joan Hewlett
 Robertson Hare as Oswald Veal
 Doreen Bendix as Prudence Malone
 Gordon James as Simon Veal
 Ethel Coleridge as Mrs Orlock
 Hubert Waring as Inspector Sibley
 Mary Brough as Mrs Hewlett

References

Bibliography
 Low, Rachael. Filmmaking in 1930s Britain. George Allen & Unwin, 1985.
 McFarlane, Brian. Cinema of Britain and Ireland. Wallflower Press, 2005.
 Wood, Linda. British Films, 1927-1939. British Film Institute, 1986.

External links

1931 films
1931 comedy films
Films directed by Tom Walls
British comedy films
Films set in England
British films based on plays
British black-and-white films
British and Dominions Studios films
Films shot at Imperial Studios, Elstree
1930s English-language films
1930s British films